Robert Middleton (born 15 January 1903) was a Scottish footballer who played as a goalkeeper.

Career
Born in Brechin, Middleton played club football for Brechin City, Cowdenbeath, Sunderland, Burton Town and Chester, and made one appearance for Scotland in 1930. For Sunderland he made 66 appearances in all competitions.

References

1903 births
Year of death missing
Scottish footballers
Scotland international footballers
Brechin City F.C. players
Cowdenbeath F.C. players
Sunderland A.F.C. players
Burton Town F.C. players
Chester City F.C. players
English Football League players
Association football goalkeepers
Place of death missing